S100 calcium-binding protein A15 (S100A15), also known as koebnerisin and S100 calcium-binding protein A7A (S100A7A), is a protein that in humans is encoded by the S100A7A (alias:S100A15) gene.

S100 proteins are a diverse calcium-binding family that regulate fundamental cellular and extracellular processes including cell proliferation and differentiation, cell migration, and the antimicrobial host defense as antimicrobial peptides.

Koebnerisin (S100A15) was first identified upregulated in inflammation-prone psoriatic skin, suggesting involvement in the lesional phenotype of the disease, Koebner phenomenon. Today, the protein is of further interest because of its role in antimicrobial defence, innate immunity, epidermal cell maturation and epithelial tumorigenesis.

Function

Epithelial homeostasis and antimicrobial host defense 

Skin: In normal epidermis, koebnerisin (S100A15) is expressed by epidermal basal and differentiated keratinocytes, melanocytes, and Langerhans cells. Within the pilosebaceous unit, S100A15 is found in the inner and external root sheath and the basal layer of the sebaceous gland. In the dermis, koebnerisin (S100A15) is produced by dendritic cells, smooth muscle cells, endothelial cells, as well as fibroblasts to control tissue regeneration.

Breast: Koebnerisin (S100A15) is expressed by alveolar and small duct luminal cells and by epithelial-derived myoepithelial cells around acini and by surrounding blood vessels.

Koebnerisin (S100A15) functions as an antimicrobial peptide (AMP) reducing survival of E. coli and was strongly regulated by several bacterial components, such as P. aeruginosa and S. aureus. Thus, koebnerisin participates in the antimicrobial host defence of the skin and in the digestive tract of breast-feeding newborns.

Epithelial carcinogenesis 

Breast cancer:  Koebnerisin (S100A15) is overexpressed in ER/PR negative tumors suggesting a regulation with tumor progression. The secreted koebnerisin (S100A15) acts as a chemoattractant, enhances inflammation and thus could drive breast carcinogenesis.

Inflammation 
Koebnerisin (S100A15) is overexpressed in inflammatory skin diseases, such as psoriasis and eczema. It is regulated through Th1 and Th17 but not Th2 proinflammatory cytokines.  When released into the extracellar space, koebnerisin (S100A15) induces inflammation. It acts as a chemoattractant for myeloid leukocytes through a pertussis toxin sensitive Gi protein coupled receptor. Koebnerisin (S100A15) amplifies inflammation with related psoriasin (S100A7) that is co-regulated and proinflammatory through RAGE.

Genomic organization and mRNA splice variants 
Koebnerisin (S100A15) maps to the S100 gene cluster within the epidermal differentiation complex (EDC, chromosome 1q21) and reveals an unusual genomic organization compared to other S100 members. The two alternative mRNA-isoforms of koebnerisin share the same coding region, but show differences in composition and length of adjacent untranslated regions (S100A15-short (S): 0.5 kb vs. hS100A15-long (L): 4.4 kb). Both splice variants are differently regulated in inflammatory skin diseases suggesting usage of alternate promoters.

Protein 

The amino acid sequence reveals a conserved C-terminal and a variant N-terminal EF-hand typical for S100 proteins (101 amino acids, 11.305 Da, calculated pI of  7.57 kDa). Compared to most S100 proteins, koebnerisin (S100A15) is basic.

Evolution

Primate 

Koebnerisin (S100A15) has lately evolved by gene duplications within the Epidermal Differentiation Complex (EDC, chromosome 1q21) during primate evolution forming a novel S100 subfamily together with Psoriasin (S100A7). Therefore, koebnerisin is almost identical to psoriasin in sequence (>90%). Despite their high homology, koebnerisin (S100A15) and psoriasin (S100A7) are distinct in tissue distribution, regulation, structure and function and, thus exemplary for the diversity within the S100 family. Their different properties are compelling reasons to discriminate S100A15 (koebnerisin) and S100A7 (psoriasin) in epithelial homeostasis, inflammation and cancer.

Rodent 

Koebnerisin (S100A15) and psoriasin (S100A7) share a common protein in mice encoded by the S100a7a15 (alias: mS100A7, mS100A15, mS100a7a) gene.  It can be used to study the significance of the corresponding human proteins for epidermal maturation, inflammation and epithelial carcinogenesis.

References

External links 
 

S100 proteins